J.C. Patterson Collegiate Institute (also known as Patterson) was a public secondary school located in downtown Windsor from 1854 until 1973.

History 

The school began as a grammar school in 1854 and was turned into a high school in 1871 and was known as Windsor Collegiate Institute until 1929, when it was renamed, J.C. Patterson, after a Windsor lawyer and politician.

The official cornerstone for the building was placed in 1888, and the school remained on the same site until its closing in 1973. The building was demolished in 1979.

Notable graduates 

 Fulton Burley, actor, singer, Disney legend
 Paul S. Morton, Baptist minister
 Fred Thomas, multi-sport athlete (baseball, basketball, football)

References 

 Hallam Collection at the Windsor Public Library
 Disney Legends Page
 Windsor Star: J.C. Patterson Collegiate pep rally, reunion planned
 International Metropolis: Patterson Collegiate - historic photos

High schools in Windsor, Ontario
Educational institutions established in 1854
1854 establishments in Canada
Demolished buildings and structures in Ontario
Buildings and structures demolished in 1979